The Misagh-2 (Also known as Mithaq-2) is an Iranian man-portable infrared-guided surface-to-air missile. The Misagh-2 is the successor to the Misagh-1. Like its predecessor, the Misagh-2 is based on Chinese technology, and in particular is believed to be an Iranian copy of the Chinese QW-1M MANPADS.

It is roughly comparable to the Soviet SA-18 Grouse missiles.

History
Iran's defense minister launched the domestic mass production of the Misagh-2 on 5 February 2006, which is manufactured at the Shahid Shah Abhady Industrial Complex.

Design
When fired, the Misagh-2 destroys its target within 5 second and has an operation temperature of -40 °C to +60 °C. The missile speed reaches 2.7+ Mach when it approaches its target.

The battery unit of the Misagh-2 is parallel to the launch tube, while the battery unit of the Misagh-1 is perpendicular. However, it is generally not possible to distinguish the Misagh-2 from the QW-1M, the QW-18, or the Misagh-3.

Operators 

 
 , Government of National Accord Affiliated Forces, probably supplied via Turkey.

References

Surface-to-air missiles of Iran
Post–Cold War weapons of Iran
Weapons and ammunition introduced in 2005
Guided missiles of Iran